John Pontifex (11 February 1796 – 7 May 1875) was an English first-class cricketer who played for Godalming Cricket Club in one match in 1825, totalling 4 runs with a highest score of 4 and holding 1 catch.

His son was Charles Pontifex, captain of Cambridge University in the 1853 University Match and later a judge in India, which gained him a knighthood.

References

Bibliography
 

English cricketers
English cricketers of 1787 to 1825
Godalming Cricket Club cricketers
1796 births
1875 deaths